Indigofera marmorata is a species of legume in the family Fabaceae. It is found only in Yemen. Its natural habitats are subtropical or tropical dry forests and subtropical or tropical dry shrubland.

References

marmorata
Endemic flora of Socotra
Least concern plants
Taxonomy articles created by Polbot
Taxa named by Isaac Bayley Balfour